An ice rise is a clearly defined elevation of the otherwise very much flatter ice shelf, typically dome-shaped and rising several hundreds of metres above the surrounding ice shelf
. An ice rise forms where the ice shelf touches the seabed due to a locally increased elevation of the seabed, which however remains below sea level. (In contrast, an elevation in the seabed that extends above sea level is defined as an island). The ice shelf flows over the seabed elevation, completely covering it with ice, thereby forming an ice rise. The resulting stress increases cause crevasse formation around the ice rise.

An island within and totally covered by the ice shelf may appear the same as an ice rise. Elaborate measurements may be required to distinguish between these two geographic features.

Although ice rises are typically located within the ice shelf area, they can partially face the open sea. At present, ice rises are found only within the ice shelves of Antarctica. The largest ice rises exceed dimensions of 50 by 200 km, or 10 000 km² in area. Some ice rises are incorrectly called islands, but also a few totally ice-covered islands within an ice shelf are also called ice rises.

Ice rises are of scientific significance because they (a) exert considerable buttressing, which affects the existence and rate of the marine ice sheet instability; and (b) they are very good sites for ice coring, owing to their being somewhat thinner than the main ice-sheet (hundreds of metres compared with thousands of metres).

Ice rises, grouped by ice shelf, clockwise starting in East Antarctica:
Brunt Ice Shelf
McDonald Ice Rumples
Riiser-Larsen Ice Shelf
Lyddan Island
King Baudouin Ice Shelf
Derwael Ice Rise
Amery Ice Shelf
Budd Ice Rumples
 IR1 to IR5 near the ice front 
Shackleton Ice Shelf
Green Ice Rises (the northernmost ice rise, at 66°21'S)
Harrisson Ice Rises
Ross Ice Shelf
Crary Ice Rise (the southernmost ice rise, at 82°56'S)
Roosevelt Island
Crosson Ice Shelf
Davis Ice Rise
Bach Ice Shelf
Burgess Ice Rise
Dvořák Ice Rise
Ives Ice Rise
Landy Ice Rises
George VI Ice Shelf
Martin Ice Rise
Wilkins Ice Shelf
Petrie Ice Rises
Schaus Ice Rises
Vere Ice Rise
Wordie Ice Shelf
Coker Ice Rise
Linchpin Ice Rise
Miller Ice Rise
Napier Ice Rise
Reynolds Ice Rise
Wade Ice Rise
Müller Ice Shelf
Humphreys Ice Rise
Larsen-C Ice Shelf
Bawden Ice Rise
Gipps Ice Rise
Tharp Ice Rise
Filchner-Ronne Ice Shelf
Belgrano II
Berkner Island
Bungenstock Ice Rise
Doake Ice Rumples
Dott Ice Rise
Fletcher Ice Rise
Fowler Ice Rise
Hemmen Ice Rise
Henry Ice Rise
Kealey Ice Rise
Kershaw Ice Rumples
Korff Ice Rise
Skytrain Ice Rise

Henry and Korff Ice Rises are the largest ice rises, with areas of roughly 1 500 to 1 600 km².

References

External links
Definition

Rise
Antarctica-related lists
 Ice rise